Santa Clara is a town and corregimiento in Arraiján District, Panamá Oeste Province, Panama with a population of 2,139 as of 2010. Its population as of 1990 was 1,422; its population as of 2000 was 1,744.

References

Corregimientos of Panamá Oeste Province